HMS Stalker was a Mark III LST (Landing Ship, Tank) that was built during the later part of the Second World War, and became the last steam-driven LST to be scrapped. She initially entered service under the designation LST 3515, but was commissioned into the Royal Navy in 1947 as HMS Stalker.

The ship was built by Canadian Yarrow at Esquimalt. She was completed too late to see action in the war, and eventually served in a submarine support role in Northern Ireland.

Scrapping 

The ship was added to the Royal Navy’s scrapping list in May 1970. She was sold to Pounds of Portsmouth in 2002, arriving there to be scrapped on 10 December 2002. She was offered for preservation between 2004 and 2005, but it was confirmed in January 2006 that she would be broken up. After further discussions with heritage and preservation groups, in 2008 her bow doors were removed and she was broken up in 2010 at Pounds scrap yard, a process recorded by National Historic Ships.

In popular culture
Whilst awaiting disposal at Pounds of Portsmouth, she was used for the filming of episodes 55 & 56 of Silent Witness, as the fictitious ship Galle. The fictitious name can be seen painted on the bow in the photo above.

References

 

LST (3)-class tank landing ships
Ships built in British Columbia
1944 ships
World War II amphibious warfare vessels of the United Kingdom
Ships and vessels on the National Archive of Historic Vessels